Image subtraction or pixel subtraction is a process whereby the digital numeric value of one pixel or whole image is subtracted from another image. This is primarily done for one of two reasons – levelling uneven sections of an image such as half an image having a shadow on it, or detecting changes between two images. This detection of changes can be used to tell if something in the image moved. This is commonly used in fields such as astrophotography to assist with the computerized search for asteroids or Kuiper belt objects in which the target is moving and would be in one place in one image, and another from an image one hour later and where using this technique would make the fixed stars in the background disappear leaving only the target. For an example see.

See also
 Dark frame subtraction – where a neutral "blank" frame is subtracted to reduce noise
 Image differencing
 Blink comparator
 Palomar Transient Factory – a wide-field survey that uses image subtraction

References

Photographic techniques
Digital photography
Astrophotography